Altica bimarginata is a species of flea beetle in the family Chrysomelidae. It is found in Central America and North America.

Subspecies
These three subspecies belong to the species Altica bimarginata:
 Altica bimarginata bimarginata Say, 1824
 Altica bimarginata labradorensis LeSage, 1993
 Altica bimarginata plicipennis (Mannerheim, 1843)

References

Further reading

 
 

Alticini
Articles created by Qbugbot
Beetles described in 1824
Taxa named by Thomas Say